Čestice is a market town in Strakonice District in the South Bohemian Region of the Czech Republic. It has about 900 inhabitants.

Administrative parts
Villages of Doubravice u Volyně, Krušlov, Nahořany, Nuzín, Radešov and Střídka are administrative parts of Čestice.

References

Populated places in Strakonice District
Market towns in the Czech Republic